{{Infobox radio station
| name             = DKTDK
| logo             = KTCK.png
| logo_caption     = ''The Tickets station logo used 2001-2013.
| city             = Sanger, Texas
| area             = Dallas-Fort Worth Metroplex/Sherman/Denison/Gainesville
| branding         = 
| airdate          = December 1989 (as KWSM)
| last_airdate     = October 7, 2013
| frequency        = 104.1 MHz
| format           = Defunct
| erp              = 6,200 watts
| haat             = 192 meters
| class            = C3
| facility_id      = 26146
| callsign_meaning = 
| former_callsigns = KWSM (1988-1997)KXIL (1997-1998)KXZN (1998-1999)KMRR (1999-2001)
| affiliations     = 
| owner            = Cumulus Media
| licensee         = Susquehanna Radio Corp.
| sister_stations  = 
| webcast          = 
| website          =  
}}KTDK was a radio station with studios located in Sanger, Texas, United States formerly under ownership of Cumulus Media. Previously, they simulcast KTCK SportsRadio 1310 The Ticket.

History
The station was granted a construction permit in 1988 as KWSM in Sherman, co-owned with KTXO (1500 AM, now KJIM); it began broadcasting in December 1989. In its early years, KWSM programmed a classic hits format. In 1993 the station moved its license to Sanger, near Denton, and moved into the Dallas-Fort Worth market; when the new facility signed on in 1994, KWSM changed its format to classic country music. From 1997 to 1999, 104.1 has seen several callsign changes beginning with a change to KXIL. A year later, Susquehanna Radio Corporation acquired the station, changed callsigns to KXZN and simulcasted KKZN "93.3 The Zone" (classic rock). The following year, 104.1 changed callsigns again to KMRR''' to allocate with 93.3's change to an adult alternative format as KKMR "Merge 93.3" (that station is now Top 40 as KLIF-FM Hot 93.3).

In May 2001, 104.1 changed callsigns to KTDK and converted to a full-time simulcast of KTCK for the northern portion of the Metroplex. This arrangement would continue for the remaining 12 years of 104.1's operation, even after Susquehanna Radio's merger with Cumulus Media in 2005 and Cumulus' acquisition of Citadel Broadcasting in 2011. In 2013, Cumulus announced that it inked a local marketing agreement with Disney's KESN ESPN 103.3. For the deal to happen, Cumulus sold KTDK to Whitley Media for $100.  The deal called for Cumulus to continue operating KTDK under a time brokerage agreement.  However, on September 20, 2013; the Federal Communications Commission rejected the sale.  The FCC ruled that since part of the sale's proceeds would go towards reimbursing Whitley for operating costs, Cumulus would retain all economic risk for operating the station.  It also ruled that Cumulus would have realized nearly all profit or loss if Whitley were to sell KTDK to a third party.  Therefore, the FCC determined that the sale to Whitley was a straw purchase in which Cumulus would remain the de facto owner of KTDK.

On October 7, 2013 the simulcast of KTCK was dropped so that Cumulus' LMA of KESN would take effect the following day and that the said simulcast would be moving to WBAP-FM 96.7. After the reopening of the federal government on October 16, it was revealed that Cumulus returned the KTDK license to the FCC on the same day. The station’s call letters have been deleted and the allocation will likely become available in a future spectrum auction.

As of April 2016, the 104.1 frequency has been utilized by a few low-powered stations such as KEJC-LP in Dallas, KYRE-LP in Mansfield, and KLEJ-LP in Fort Worth; all broadcasting at 100 watts. There are other applications on file with the FCC for more Low Power FM stations within the Dallas/Fort Worth area on this particular frequency.

References

External links
 DFW Radio/TV History

TDK-FM
Radio stations established in 1989
1989 establishments in Texas
Radio stations disestablished in 2013
2013 disestablishments in Texas
Defunct radio stations in the United States
TDK